The men's 110 kg weightlifting competitions at the 1984 Summer Olympics in Los Angeles took place on 7 August at the Albert Gersten Pavilion. It was the fifteenth appearance of the heavyweight II class.

Results

References

Weightlifting at the 1984 Summer Olympics